= Emanuele Serrano =

Italian sculptor

Emanuele Serrano (Chieti, Region of Abruzzo, active in late 19th-century) was an Italian sculptor, mainly in terracotta.

In 1880 at the fourth Mostra Nazionale of Fine Arts in Turin, he exhibited a terracotta group depicting: Il ritorno della sera di contadini Abruzzesi (Peasants from Abbruzzo returning at night). Other similar works are: Mincuccio il figlio mio; Le canzoni d' amore; La Vendemmia, exhibited at Milan, in 1881. In 1883 at Rome, he exhibited: Carminantonio lu capraro and Uva e fichi. In Turin, in 1884, he displayed a bust: Pepaolotto, exhibited then in 1889 at the Florentine Exhibition of Fine Arts, alongside his sculpture Si rimira. Both these were exhibited that year at the Exposition of Paris, with the latter winning a prize. At Exhibition of Fine Arts in Florence he exhibited a rural procession titled: Viva Maria. He completed a terra cotta half bust of a boy with a chicken: Fanciullo con gallina and a peasant Narcisa.
